Cardiff Roman Fort was a coastal fort in the Roman province of Britannia Superior, of which Roman Wales was a part. Its original Latin name is uncertain. Its remains are incorporated into Cardiff Castle in the modern capital city of Wales.

Name

The fort's name is uncertain. It could have been Tamium as appears in the Ravenna Cosmography, although this may have been a river name and thus refers to the River Taff. Alternatively it may be Bovium (corrected from Bomio) of the Antonine Itinerary.

Early forts
Prior to the building of the extant fort, there were at least two previous Roman forts on the site. The first was probably a vexillation camp built during attempted conquest of the Silures tribe around AD 55. About twenty years later, after a period of abandonment, a new smaller Roman auxiliary fort was constructed and was possibly occupied, along with a civilian vicus, until the reign of the Emperor Hadrian. From the late 2nd to the mid-3rd century, civilian timber buildings associated with iron working occupied the site.

Carausian shore fort

Around 290, a 9-acre (3.57 hectare) shore fort was built on the site, not unlike the almost complete example at Portchester in Hampshire. Its walls were ten feet thick and it was positioned to control access to the upper reaches of the River Severn. There may have been associated watch towers on the now eroded cliffs to the west. This is believed to have been the Emperor Carausius' response to increased Irish raids. Its military/naval force eventually moved elsewhere about 370.

Post-Roman legends
The ruinous fort appears as the residence of 'King Ynwyl' in the story of Geraint and Enid, a medieval romance associated with the Mabinogion. Geraint was possibly a 5th-century King of Dumnonia.

References
Notes

Bibliography

External links 

Cardiff Roman Fort on the Roman Britain website
Aerial photo of the site taken in 1988

Roman fortifications in Cardiff
Archaeological sites in Cardiff
Scheduled monuments in Cardiff
History of Cardiff
Former populated places in Wales
Roman auxiliary forts in Wales
Roman legionary fortresses in Wales